Muchas Flores (Many Flowers) is the sixth studio album released by Spanish performer Rosario Flores. It was released by BMG International in 2001. The album was produced by Fernando Illán and Cachorro López. Muchas Flores earned Flores a Latin Grammy Award for Best Female Pop Vocal Album. Flores recorded songs written by Jorge Drexler, Andrés Calamaro, Alberto Moraga and herself. The album lead single, "Cómo Quieres Que Te Quiera", features the participation of Raimundo Amador playing guitar and Luis Dulzaines on percussion.

The release of the album was named "the return of Rosario," since critics and public rejected her previous album, Jugar a la Locura (1999), a Rock-infused album. Muchas Flores proved to be a success, selling 250,000 units in Spain, aided by the singer exposure on Talk to Her, a 2002 film by Pedro Almodóvar. Flores also did a small promotional tour in the United States to benefit the album, and a full length worldwide tour, which lasted two years and concluded with the recording of her following album De Mil Colores.

Muchas Flores received mixed critical reviews. Chris Nickson of AllMusic gave the album 2 stars out of 5. Nickson named Flores an "excellent singer", with the album starting with a raw flamenco yell and flourish, but quickly becomes straight forward Latin pop without "too many sparks flying."

Track listing
This information adapted from Allmusic.

Certifications

References

2001 albums
Albums produced by Cachorro López
Rosario Flores albums
Spanish-language albums
Latin Grammy Award for Best Female Pop Vocal Album